Hopeless to Hopeful... is an album released by Matthew Ryan in December 2002. It was recorded in his own home.

Track listing
All words and music by Matthew Ryan.

 "Rain, Rain, Rain" – 1:32
 "Song for Sons" – 2:48
 "Veteran's Day" – 3:25
 "I'm an American" – 2:56
 "Everybody Always Leaves" – 2:54
 "I Can't Steal You" – 4:04
 "This Side of Heaven" – 2:26
 "Postcard to Useless" – 3:57
 "Little Drummer Boy" – 4:45
 "From the Floor" – 3:44

2002 albums
Matthew Ryan (musician) albums